Summer Days (And Summer Nights!!) is the ninth studio album by American rock band the Beach Boys, released on July 5, 1965, on Capitol. The band's previous album, The Beach Boys Today! (released March 1965), represented a departure for the group through its abandonment of themes related to surfing, cars, and teenage love, but it sold below Capitol's expectations. In response, the label pressured the group to produce bigger hits. Summer Days thus returned the band's music to simpler themes for one last album, with Brian Wilson combining Capitol's commercial demands with his artistic calling.

Produced by Wilson, Summer Days reached number two on the US Billboard 200 and number four on the UK Albums Chart. Two singles were issued from the album: "Help Me, Rhonda", which became the group's second chart-topper in the US, and "California Girls", which peaked at number three.

Background
Carl Wilson reflected of Summer Days, "There was a time when it was uncool to be into the Beach Boys, and when we did that album, it started to bother us, doing this same stuff, because we thought we were trapped into having to sing about a certain thing."

Unreleased material
One outtake from the album's sessions is known as "Sandy" or "Sherry She Needs Me", and was written by Brian Wilson with Russ Titelman. "Sherry She Needs Me" was revisited by the Beach Boys during 1976's The Beach Boys Love You sessions. The composition remained dormant until 1998, when it was finally finished by Wilson as "She Says That She Needs Me" for his 1998 Imagination solo album. The Beach Boys' version of "Sherry She Needs Me" was released in 2013 for the Made in California box set.

Cover photo
Summer Days (And Summer Nights!!) includes Bruce Johnston's first appearance on a Beach Boys album. As Brian Wilson's stage replacement, he was not yet considered an "official" member, but Wilson appreciated Johnston's skills enough to have him contribute vocally and instrumentally on the album. Johnston would often accompany the group on photo shoots, but he was prohibited from having those pictures published on album covers due to a preexisting contract with Columbia Records. Along with Johnston, Al Jardine is also missing from the Summer Days cover photo depicting the group on a sailboat, having missed the shoot due to illness.

Reception

Summer Days (And Summer Nights!!) proved to be another gold-selling success for the Beach Boys in the U.S., where it hit number 2 behind The Rolling Stones's Out of Our Heads. Along with 1963's Surfin' U.S.A. it remains the group's highest-charting studio album in the U.S. The following year, the album would reach number 4 in the United Kingdom. The album's lead single, "Help Me, Rhonda", topped the US Billboard Hot 100.

In a 2011 reappraisal, BBC Music observed that the track listing of Summer Days reads "like a Greatest Hits," and felt the album is unfairly disparaged for being "simply loaded with proud pop songs." Comparing to the Beach Boys' later work: "If Pet Sounds is the critics’ favorite, Summer Days is perhaps the people's day at the beach." That same year, the online journal Rocksucker praised the album, ranking it 4th in its list of "Ten Underappreciated Beach Boys LPs," but considers it "an inconsistent collection of which the high points are truly great and the low points ranging from merely good to just-about-passing-muster."

Release history 
In the early 1970s, as part of Capitol Records' repackage series of their Beach Boys albums, Summer Days (And Summer Nights!!) was retitled California Girls and deleted two tracks: "Amusement Parks U.S.A." and "I'm Bugged at My Ol' Man". In 1990, the album was reissued paired with The Beach Boys Today!; this package featured extensive liner notes and bonus tracks from that period. In its 2012 reissue, the album received its first true stereo mix.

Track listing 

Notes
 Mike Love was not originally credited for "The Girl from New York City", "Amusement Parks U.S.A.", "Salt Lake City", "Help Me, Rhonda", "California Girls", "Let Him Run Wild", and "You're So Good to Me". His credits were awarded after a 1990s lawsuit.

Personnel
Sourced from Musician's Union AFM contract sheets and surviving session audio, documented by Craig Slowinski.

The Beach Boys
Al Jardine – lead, harmony and backing vocals; electric rhythm guitar; bass guitar; handclaps
Mike Love – lead, harmony and backing vocals; handclaps
Brian Wilson – lead, harmony and backing vocals; bass guitar; acoustic upright piano; hammond organ; handclaps
Carl Wilson – lead, harmony and backing vocals; lead, rhythm, acoustic and 12-string guitar; bass guitar; handclaps
Dennis Wilson – harmony and backing vocals; drums, tambourine, handclaps

Guests
Bruce Johnston – harmony and backing vocals; acoustic grand piano, Hammond organ, celeste; castanets; handclaps
Ron Swallow – tambourine

Session musicians

Israel Baker – violin
Arnold Belnick – violin
Hal Blaine – drums, timbales
Glen Campbell – electric guitar
Frank Capp – vibraphone
Roy Caton – trumpet
Jerry Cole – twelve-string guitar
Al De Lory – organ
Joseph DiFlore – viola
Steve Douglas – tenor saxophone
James Getzoff – violin
William Hinshaw – French horn
Harry Hyams – viola
Plas Johnson – tenor saxophone
Carol Kaye – electric bass guitar
Bernard Kundell – violin
Jay Migliori – baritone saxophone
Leonard Malarsky – violin
Jack Nimitz – bass saxophone
Bill Pitman – electric guitar
Ray Pohlman – bass guitar
Lyle Ritz – upright bass
Howard Roberts – guitar
Leon Russell – piano
Billy Lee Riley – harmonica
Ralph Schaeffer – violin
Sid Sharp – violin
Billy Strange – rhythm guitar, ukulele; tambourine
Tommy Tedesco – lead guitar on "Summer Means New Love"
Julius Wechter – claves
Tibor Zelig – violin

Technical
Chuck Britz – engineer

Charts

References

Bibliography

External links

The Beach Boys albums
1965 albums
Capitol Records albums
Albums produced by Brian Wilson
Albums recorded at Gold Star Studios
Albums recorded at United Western Recorders